Manikpur, Officially known as Manikpur Sarhat is a town of the Indian state of Uttar Pradesh in Chitrakoot district, it has population around 15,435 as per 2011-2020 census, which makes it a nagar panchayat, and Tahseel in Manikpur. It is located at 25°55′59″N 81°58′59″E25.933°N 81.983°E and surrounded by large Vindh mountain range.

Demographics

As of 2011 India census, Manikpur Sarhat had a population of 15,435. Males constitute 53% of the population and females 47%. Manikpur Sarhat has an average literacy rate of 62%, higher than the national average of 59.5%: male literacy is 72%, and female literacy is 50%. In Manikpur Sarhat, 18% of the population is under 6 years of age.

References

Cities and towns in Chitrakoot district